False attribution can refer to:
 Misattribution in general, when a quotation or work is accidentally, traditionally, or based on bad information attributed to the wrong person or group
 A specific fallacy where an advocate appeals to an irrelevant, unqualified, unidentified, biased, or fabricated source in support of an argument.

Incorrect identification of source
One particular case of misattribution is the Matthew effect. A quotation is often attributed to someone more famous than the real author. This leads the quotation to be more famous, but the real author to be forgotten (see also: obliteration by incorporation).

Such misattributions may originate as a sort of fallacious argument, if use of the quotation is meant to be persuasive, and attachment to a more famous person (whether intentionally or through misremembering) would lend it more authority.

In Jewish biblical studies, an entire group of falsely-attributed books is known as the pseudepigrapha.

Fallacy
A fraudulent advocate may go so far as to fabricate a source in order to support a claim. For example, the "Levitt Institute" was a fake organisation created in 2009 solely for the purposes of (successfully) fooling the Australian media into reporting that Sydney was Australia’s most naive city.

Contextomy (quoting out of context) is a type of false attribution.

See also
 Fake news

References

Further reading

External links
 Quote Investigator

Verbal fallacies